Louise Platt (August 3, 1915 – September 6, 2003) was an American theater, film, and TV actress.

Early years
Platt was born in Stamford, Connecticut, and grew up in Annapolis, Maryland. Her father was a dental surgeon in the Navy.

Career 
Platt's first professional acting experience came in stock theater in Suffern, New York. She went on to act in stock productions "from Maine to Virginia to Minnesota". Her Broadway credits include The Traitor (1949), Anne of the Thousand Days (1948), Five Alarm Waltz (1941), In Clover (1937), Promise (1936), Spring Dance (1936), and A Room in Red and White (1936).

Platt is best remembered for her role as the officer's pregnant wife in John Ford's Stagecoach (1939). After two years on Broadway, she came to Hollywood in 1938. She returned to the New York stage in 1942 after acting in a half-dozen movies. She worked with Rex Harrison in Anne of the Thousand Days on Broadway in 1948 and in the 1950s played a variety of roles on television, including two appearances on Alfred Hitchcock Presents and a recurring role as Ruth Holden on The Guiding Light.

Personal life 
Platt was first married to theater director Jed Harris, who abused her. On August 25, 1950, she married director Stanley Gould in North Guilford, Connecticut. They remained together until his death. Each marriage produced a daughter.

Death 
On September 6, 2003, Platt died at a hospital in Greenport, New York, at age 88. The cause of her death was not disclosed.

Filmography

References

External links

Portraits of Louise Platt from Stagecoach by Ned Scott

1915 births
2003 deaths
American stage actresses
American film actresses
American television actresses
Actresses from Stamford, Connecticut
People from Greenport, Suffolk County, New York
20th-century American actresses
21st-century American women